Phytomyza spondylii is a species of leaf miner fly in the family Agromyzidae. The larvae develop inside the leaves of its host plant, making a conspicuous whitish mine. Host plants include Astrantia bieberstedtii, red masterwort Astrantia carniolica, giant hogweed Heracleum mantegazzianum, hogweed Heracleum sphondylium and wild parsnip Pastinaca sativa.

References

Phytomyza
Articles created by Qbugbot
Insects described in 1851